Satala or Satala  in Lydia was a Roman era city and Bishopric in ancient Lydia.

Location
Its site is located near Adala in Asiatic Turkey.

Pagan Religion
The city worshiped the  typical mother and son pantheon found throughout Anatolia, and although a temple was built it did not mint coint as the town was only a village.
It was part of a decapolis called the Katakekaumene, and May have been its religious center.

Bishopric
The city was also a see in the province of Lydia, and remains a vacant and titular see to this day. It is in the province of Sardis.

Known Bishops 
Andrew(Council of Chalcedon)
Elpidius of Satala  banished after the Council of Constantinople
Giuliano signed in 458 the letter of the bishops of Lydia to ' Emperor Leo I after the death of Proterius of Alexandria. 
Michael attended the Second Council of Nicaea (787) .
  Philip took part in the Council of Constantinople (879)

Today Satala Lidia survives as titular bishop of the Roman Catholic Church but the seat is vacant since 22 October 1819 . 
 Catholic Titular Bishop Nikodem Puzyna    September 26, 1814   October 22, 1819.

See also
Satala,  East Turkey
Satala Cemetery,  American Samoa

References

Former populated places in Turkey
Catholic titular sees in Asia
Dioceses established in the 1st century
Greek colonies in Anatolia
Ancient Greek archaeological sites in Turkey
Populated places in ancient Lydia
Roman towns and cities in Turkey
History of Manisa Province